Patrick Willems (born 10 November 1945) is a Belgian rower. He competed in the men's double sculls event at the 1976 Summer Olympics.

References

1945 births
Living people
Belgian male rowers
Olympic rowers of Belgium
Rowers at the 1976 Summer Olympics
Place of birth missing (living people)